The Trump Card (French: Dernier atout) is a 1942 French crime film directed by Jacques Becker and starring Mireille Balin,  Raymond Rouleau and Pierre Renoir.

The film marked Becker's full debut as a director, although he had briefly worked on Cristobal's Gold in 1940. It was filmed partly on the French Riviera, which stood in for South America. Interiors were filmed at the Victorine Studios and at Pathé's studio in Paris. The film's sets were designed by the art director Max Douy. During production Becker used the pretext of filming to liaise between French Resistance groups in Paris and the South.

Synopsis
In a Latin American country, two young policeman finish joint top of their graduating detective class. To separate them, they take on an investigation at a luxury hotel to see who is the better detective. The case proves however, to have been the murder of a notorious American gangster, killed by his former associates from Chicago.

Cast

References

Bibliography 
 C.G. Crisp The Classic French Cinema, 1930-1960. Indiana University Press, 1993.
 Ann Lloyd & David Robinson. The Illustrated history of the cinema. Macmillan, 1987.

External links 
 

1942 films
French crime films
1942 crime films
1940s French-language films
Films directed by Jacques Becker
Films set in South America
French black-and-white films
Films shot at Victorine Studios
1940s French films